Jopek is a surname. Notable people with the surname include:

Anna Maria Jopek (born 1970), Polish vocalist, songwriter and improviser
Björn Jopek (born 1993), German footballer
Mike Jopek (born 1964), American politician